Maurice Gomis (born 10 November 1997) is a professional footballer who plays for Cypriot side Ayia Napa. Born in Italy, he plays for the Guinea-Bissau national team.

Club career

Torino
He is a product of Torino youth teams, just as his older brothers Lys Gomis and Alfred Gomis are, they are also both goalkeepers. He was included on their Under-19 squad for the first time at the age of 16 in the 2014–15 season. He did not make any appearances for that squad that season, serving as back-up for Andrea Zaccagno and Nicholas Lentini. In the next 2015–16 season he was sent on loans to Serie D teams, first Delta Rovigo and then Mestre.

On 19 July 2016, he joined his hometown team Cuneo on a permanent basis, also in the Serie D. He became the first-choice goalkeeper for the club in the subsequent 2016–17 season.

On 29 August 2017, he moved to yet another Serie D club, this time Nocerina. At Nocerina, Gomis also was the first-choice goalkeeper.

SPAL
On 6 July 2018, he signed a three-year contract with Serie A club SPAL, where he became the back-up to his own brother Alfred.

Loan to Siracusa
On 26 July 2018, he joined Serie C club Siracusa on a season-long loan. On 9 September 2018, he suffered minor injuries in a car accident which also killed the driver of the car, 27-year-old Siracusa club employee Davide Artale.

Upon his recovery, he made his Serie C debut for Siracusa on 15 October 2018 in a game against Reggina.

Loan to Kukësi
On 31 January 2019, he moved to Albania on a new loan to Kukësi.

International career
Gomis was called up by Guinea-Bissau in late May 2021. He debuted with them in a 0–0 2021 Africa Cup of Nations tie with Sudan on 11 January 2022.

Personal life
Gomis' older brothers, Lys and Alfred, have represented Senegal internationally. He is of Senegalese and Bissau-Guinean descent.

References

External links
 

1997 births
Living people
People from Cuneo
Bissau-Guinean footballers
Guinea-Bissau international footballers
Italian footballers
Bissau-Guinean people of Senegalese descent
Italian people of Bissau-Guinean descent
Italian people of Senegalese descent
Citizens of Guinea-Bissau through descent
Association football goalkeepers
FK Kukësi players
Bissau-Guinean expatriate footballers
Bissau-Guinean expatriate sportspeople in Albania
Expatriate footballers in Albania
Footballers from Piedmont
A.C. Cuneo 1905 players
A.S.D. Nocerina 1910 players
S.P.A.L. players
Siracusa Calcio players
Serie C players
Serie D players
Italian sportspeople of African descent
Italian expatriate footballers
Italian expatriate sportspeople in Albania
2021 Africa Cup of Nations players
Sportspeople from the Province of Cuneo